This is a list of Philippine twin towns, sister cities and other international relationships. In most cases, the association, especially when formalized by local government, is known as "town twinning" or "sister cities", and while most of the places included are cities, it also includes municipalities, provinces and a region.

The list is arranged by regions and then by provinces and then cities and municipalities. See also the lists of twin towns and sister cities.

Regions

M
Metro Manila
 Shanghai, China

Provinces

A
Albay
 Lanzhou, China

B
Benguet
 Kōchi Prefecture, Japan

Bohol
 Jiangxi, China

C
Cebu
 Hainan, China
 Saint Petersburg, Russia, since 2010

I
Ilocos Norte
 Shandong, China

Ilocos Sur
Isabela

L
Laguna
 Fujian, China

Leyte
 Hubei, China

N
Nueva Ecija
 Anhui, China

P
Pangasinan

R
Rizal
 New Taipei, Taiwan

Z
Zambales
 Maui County, Hawaii, United States

Cities

A
Angeles City
 Las Vegas, Nevada, United States

B
Bacolod
 Andong, South Korea, since 2008
 Keelung, Taiwan
 Long Beach, California, United States
Singaraja, Indonesia, since 2008

Baguio
 Bacarra, Ilocos Norte, Philippines, since 2012
 Cusco, Perú
 Dalaguete, Cebu, Philippines, since 2012
 Hangzhou, Zhejiang, China
 Hanyū, Saitama, Japan
 Honolulu, Hawaii, United States, since 1995
 Kislovodsk, Stavropol Krai, Russia
 Libon, Albay, Philippines, since 2012
 Pudtol, Apayao, Philippines, since 2012
 Taebaek, South Korea
 Vallejo, California, United States
 Vaughan, Ontario, Canada
 Wakkanai, Hokkaido, Japan

C
Cagayan de Oro
 Gwangyang, South Korea, since October 29, 2012
 Harbin, Heilongjiang, China
 Norfolk, Virginia, United States
 Tainan City, Taiwan, since September 9, 2005

Calamba
 Guri, South Korea
 Litoměřice, Czech Republic
 Walnut, California, United States
 Wilhelmsfeld, Baden-Württemberg, Germany

Cavite City
 San Diego, California, United States 
 Tainan City, Taiwan, since August 16, 1980

Cebu City

 Chula Vista, California, United States
 Honolulu, Hawaii, United States, since 1990
 Sabrosa, Portugal
 Seattle, Washington, United States
 Xiamen, China
 Yeosu, South Korea
 Guadalajara, Mexico

Cotabato City
 Quezon City, Philippines
 Bandung, Indonesia

D
Dagupan
 Iwata, Shizuoka, Japan
 Milpitas, California, United States

Dapitan
 Litoměřice, Czech Republic

Davao City
 Guangxi Zhuang Autonomous Region, China
 Bacoor, Cavite, Philippines
 Bitung, Indonesia
 Quezon City, Philippines
 Tacoma, Washington, United States

Dipolog
 Yancheng District, Kaohsiung City, Taiwan (2018)

Dumaguete
 Yeongdong County, South Korea
 Alameda, California, United States

I
Iloilo City
 Dededo, Guam, since 1994
 Qingdao, Shandong, China, since 2003
 Quezon City, Philippines, since 1994
 Stockton, California, United States, since 1956
 Yulin, Guangxi, China, since 2011
 Bilbao, Spain

L
La Carlota
 Carson, California, United States

Laoag
 Honolulu, Hawaii, United States, since 1969
 Laibin, China

Lapu-Lapu
 Sanya, China

Las Piñas

Legazpi
 Chōshi, Chiba, Japan

Lipa
 Fremont, California, United States
 Fushun, China

M
Makati, Malabon, Manila, Mandaluyong, Marikina, and Muntinlupa

Malolos
 Bayambang, Philippines
 Hagåtña, Guam

Mandaue
 Bacău, Romania
 Zibo, Shandong, China

N
Naga
 Shishi City, Fujian, China

O
Olongapo
 National City, California, United States

P
Pagadian
 Cooma, New South Wales, Australia

Parañaque, Pasig, and Pasay

Puerto Princesa
 Beihai, China
 Maui County, Hawaii, United States, since 1999 as a Friendship City
 Wuxi, China
 Quezon City, Philippines

Q
Quezon City

R
Roxas City

 Quezon City, Philippines
 San Bernardino, California, United States
 Guam, United States
 Balıkesir, Turkey

S
San Juan 

Silay
 Amagi, Kagoshima, Japan

Sorsogon City
 Ceuta, Spain
 Legazpi, Philippines
 Iloilo City, Philippines
 Pasay, Philippines
 Sterling Heights, Michigan, United States
 Zamboanga City, Philippines

T
Tacloban
 Fukuyama, Hiroshima, Japan

Tagaytay
 Rohnert Park, California, United States
 Tainan City, Taiwan, since August 16, 1980
 Tagbilaran
 Iligan, Philippines, since June 2011 
 Makati, Philippines, since July 2009 
 Puerto Princesa, Philippines, since February 2017 
 Zumarraga, Gipuzkoa, Spain, since 1993 
Trece Mártires
 Tainan City, Taiwan, since August 16, 1980

U
Urdaneta
 Ordizia, Spain

V
Valenzuela

Vigan
 Honolulu, Hawaii, United States, since 2003

Z
Zamboanga City
 Zaragoza, Spain
 Sandakan, Sabah, Malaysia

Municipalities

A
Alimodian, Iloilo
 Santa Rosa, Laguna Philippines
Alicia, Isabela
 Quezon City, Philippines

B
Bacarra, Ilocos Norte
 Maui County, Hawaii, United States, since 1970

Badoc, Ilocos Norte
 Maui County, Hawaii, United States, since 2010

Balatan, Camarines Sur
 Makati, Philippines

Banaybanay, Davao Oriental
 Quezon City, Philippines

Bangued, Abra
 Vigan, Ilocos Sur, Philippines

Bauang, La Union
 Lakewood, Washington, United States

Baybay, Leyte
 Union City, California, United States

Bayombong, Nueva Vizcaya
 Gonohe, Aomori, Japan

Bolinao, Pangasinan
 Mobile, Alabama, United States

C
Cabugao, Ilocos Sur
 Maui County, Hawaii, United States, since 2005

Camiling, Tarlac
 Juneau, Alaska, United States

D
Danao, Bohol
 La Trinidad, Benguet, Philippines

F
Famy, Laguna
 Makati, Philippines

G
General Trias
 Tozawa, Yamagata, Japan

I
Infanta, Quezon
 Makati, Philippines

Itogon, Benguet
 Makati, Philippines

K
Kalibo, Aklan
 Juneau, Alaska, United States

Kawit, Cavite
 Sakegawa, Yamagata, Japan

L
La Trinidad, Benguet
 Danao, Bohol, Philippines
 Hitachiōta, Ibaraki, Japan
 Quezon City, Philippines
 Miyako, Iwate, Japan

N
Naguilian, La Union
 Suisun City, California, United States

P
Palo, Leyte
 Palo Alto, California, United States

Pura, Tarlac
 Quezon City, Philippines

S
Sadanga, Mountain Province
 Quezon City, Philippines

San Juan, Ilocos Sur
 Maui County, Hawaii, United States, since 1991 as a Friendship City

San Nicolas, Ilocos Norte
 Maui County, Hawaii, United States, since 2006

Santa, Ilocos Sur
 Maui County, Hawaii, United States, since 1991 as a Friendship City

Sariaya, Quezon
 Santa Clarita, California, United States

Sarrat, Ilocos Norte
 Maui County, Hawaii, United States, since 2006

T
Tanza,Cavite
 Geumsan-gun, South Korea

See also
 Lists of twin towns and sister cities
 List of twin towns and sister cities in Asia
 List of sister cities in Metro Manila

Notes

References

Philippines
Sister cities
Sister cities
Foreign relations of the Philippines
Populated places in the Philippines